Pasonanca Park is a public park located in Pasonanca in Zamboanga City, Philippines.

History
Construction of the park was started in 1912 by General John J. Pershing, Governor of the Moro Province, and completed during the administration of the Frank W. Carpenter, Governor of the Department of Mindanao and Sulu (1914-1920). Thomas Hanley, a parksman, arrived in 1912 from the United States at the request of Pershing to serve the same post at Pasonanca, and was responsible for the original lay-out of the park.

The park also has a separate campsites for males and females, an amphitheatre, and a convention center, among other facilities.

Pasonanca Park Swimming Pools

The park has three public pools. It boasts an Olympic-size swimming pool, a natural flowing pool and a children's pool with water slides. There are also many picnic areas.

Pictured here is the Pasonanca Kiddie Pool. Designed for children's safety. There are four water slides. The slide farthest to the right is for the beginner. The one farthest to the left is the fastest slide.

The water in the pool is not stagnant. It is constantly replenished by a surge of water naturally drained into the pool by gravity. As the water fills the pool it is also immediately drained to create a natural creek that flows down the hill.
The kiosks are available for rent for the whole day.

Pasonanca Tree House
Originally constructed to be the "Youth Citizenship Training Center" in April 1960 with the generous assistance of the city council. This Pasonanca Tree House is visited by thousands of visitor per year. For a minimum fee you can rent this tree house. Then you can boast to your friends that you spent the night in a tree house. It has all the amenities of a small motel room.

Pasonanca Park La Jardin de Maria Clara Lobregat and Butterfly Park

This is a garden park named after the late mayor Maria Clara Lobregat. The park consists of floral and butterfly species such as orchids, roses and colorful butterflies surrounding the garden. It also has an aviary park for the avian species such as parrots, turkeys, and eagles among the birds.

The entrance fee is much cheaper than other parks in Zamboanga.

Places that can also be found in Pasonanca Park

Parks in the Philippines
Buildings and structures in Zamboanga City
Tourist attractions in Zamboanga City